Lee Hye-ryeon (이혜련), later name changed to Heo Yun (허윤), (May 3, 1981 – January 21, 2007) best known by her stage name as U;Nee was a South Korean singer, rapper, dancer and actress.

U;Nee committed suicide on January 21, 2007, at age 25.

Early life
U;Nee was born Lee Hye-ryeon (이혜련) in South Korea. She had a difficult childhood and was born to an unwed mother. Her father died when she was young and she was raised by her grandmother as result.

Music career

2003: Debut and U;Nee Code
In 2003, U;Nee debuted as a dance-pop singer, with upbeat songs (although some of her songs were upbeat songs, she rapped in many of them), as heard in her very first single, 가 (Go). The song was well received by Korean media, and garnered her many fans. The track was then featured on her debut album, U;Nee Code, released on June 12, 2003. U;Nee Code sold well.

2005: Image transition, Call Call Call and Passion & Pure – EP
In 2005, her record label, J'S Entertainment, started to market her as a sexy singer, focusing more on her image, while transforming her dance-pop style music into a sexy R&B sound, as heard in her 2005 single, "Call Call Call". U;Nee underwent plastic surgery, enlarging her breast size in the process and having slight surgery on her jaw and nose. Soon after, U;Nee released her 2nd album, Call Call Call, with sales equally similar to U;Nee Code, even though the lead single, Call Call Call, was performed frequently and landed within the top 10 of Korean music charts. U;Nee's record company then tried to advertise her more as a sexy singer, which gave her harsh criticism from netizens. U;Nee, who was personally soft-spoken and reserved, found this difficult to bear. U;Nee was also known as "ユニ" (Yuni) in Japan.

2006: U;Nee in Japan
In 2006, U;Nee was marketed abroad in Asia. Her debut single, One, taken from Call Call Call, was released in Japan in February 2006. The single also included an alternate version of Sun Cruise from her debut album, U;Nee Code, and Follow Me, a song that would later appear on her 3rd and final album, Habit. She held a showcase performing a variety of her songs from her Call Call Call album with great reviews, thus gaining her many fans in Japan.

Death and impact

On January 21, 2007, at the age of 25, U;Nee was found dead at her home by her grandmother in Seo-gu, Incheon, South Korea. After an investigation by the police, it was determined that Lee had suffered from depression and stress. There was no suicide note found, but she did write that she felt lonely on a website saying, "I feel everything is empty. I am again walking down a path to reach a destination that I don't know."

U;Nee's management company released her third album as planned on January 26, 2007, five days after her death.

Filmography
 "New Generation Report – Adults Don't Know"
 "Seventeen"
 "Zilzu"
 "Speeding"
 "The Theme Game"
 "The Tears of a Dragon"
 "The King and the Queen"
 X-Man

Discography
 U;Nee Code (2003)
 Call Call Call (2005)
 Habit (2007)

Music videos
 "Go"
 "Call Call Call"
 "Habit"

References

External links
 U;Nee on Daum Cafe

1981 births

2007 suicides
Female suicides
K-pop singers
Musicians from Incheon
South Korean women pop singers
South Korean film actresses
South Korean female idols
South Korean television actresses
Suicides by hanging in South Korea
20th-century South Korean women singers